The 1550 class was a class of diesel locomotives built by Clyde Engineering, Eagle Farm for Queensland Railways between 1972 and 1976.

History
The 1550 class were the first locomotives in Queensland to be fitted with low noses. An initial order for 16 locomotives was followed by 11 that were financed by the Queensland Phosphate mining group. The second batch differed in having a lower roofline to give better clearance when operating under wires.

Two have been scrapped, while between 1997 and 2004, 19 were rebuilt as 2300 class locomotives, and six as 2250 class locomotives at Redbank Railway Workshops.

References

Clyde Engineering locomotives
Co-Co locomotives
Diesel locomotives of Queensland
Queensland Rail locomotives
Railway locomotives introduced in 1972
Diesel-electric locomotives of Australia
3 ft 6 in gauge locomotives of Australia